Other Ocean Interactive is a Canadian-American video game developer based in St. John's, Newfoundland and Labrador, and Emeryville, California. Originally founded in 2006 in Charlottetown, as a studio for Foundation 9 Entertainment, the studio was spun off as Other Ocean Interactive in May 2007. Since then, it has made eight games itself and has been involved in the development of 40 other games.

History 
Foundation 9 Entertainment, at the time the largest independent video game developer in North America, announced on 6 February 2006 that it was opening Backbone Charlottetown, a new internal studio based in Charlottetown, Canada. When co-founder Andrew Ayre left Foundation 9 a year later, he bought out and became the sole owner of the Backbone Charlottetown studio, which was renamed Other Ocean Interactive that May. By 2008, the company established headquarters in St. John's, Newfoundland and Labrador.

Games developed 
Other Ocean Interactive developed the following games:

References

External links 
 

2006 establishments in Prince Edward Island
Companies based in St. John's, Newfoundland and Labrador
Companies based in Emeryville, California
Video game companies established in 2006
Video game development companies
Video game companies of Canada
Video game companies of the United States